The American Tragedy is a rock and roll band from Shreveport, Louisiana, United States.

Touring 
The American Tragedy has shared the stage with Staind, Thursday, Godsmack, Saliva, Flaw, L.A. Guns, and Bowling For Soup.
 
They have also done 4 tours from coast to coast in the United States performing at notable venues such as: House of Blues New Orleans, Whisky a Go Go in Los Angeles, The Mason Jar Phoenix, The Milk Bar in San Francisco, The Big Fish Pub in Tempe, CBGB in Manhattan, Classic Rock Cafe in Oklahoma City, Fitzgerald's in Houston, Howlin' Wolf in New Orleans, Tipitina's in New Orleans, Hard Rock Cafe in Orlando and also have sold over 8,000 CDs from touring alone.

Reviews 
"The American Tragedy's exquisite CD is complemented by an explosive live show and finished off with genuine professionalism usually found at the theatre and arena level. Driving guitars that hook the hard rockers balanced by beautifully melodic songwriting that keeps the girls dancing in the front rows."  -Casey Phillips, Infectious Publicity New Orleans, LA

"THE AMERICAN TRAGEDY is a breath of fresh air in the wake of the hardcore/thrash sound that seems so prevalent in the music scene. Aggressive and powerful, yet very accessible. Well crafted songs, an amazing sense of dynamics, great musicianship, and a stellar vocal performance - these songs stand up to anything I've had come across my desk in a long time. THE AMERICAN TRAGEDY could well be the band that puts Shreveport on the rock map."  - Paul Cannell, Program Director, KOOJ Rock 93.7 –Baton Rouge, LA

"PURE ENERGY! ...CHOREOGRAPHED CHAOS!............STAND BACK WHILE THESE GUYS BLOW UP!!!!"-B-1 Boomer, Program Director KPGG Radio Texarkana, TX

Members 
Current	
 Adam Dale - Vocals, Guitars (2000–2015)
 Jackie Brock - Guitars (2001–2015)
 Ryan Dougherty - Bass (2010–2015)
 Trey Danger - Drums (2000–2015)

Former
 J.C. Eiland - Bass (2000–2003)
 Jason Sepulvado - Bass (2003–2010)

Guests and additional members
 Eric Denny - Guitar on Pennies

Discography

Studio albums

Singles 
2006: The Rosenburg
2012: Everyone Will Finish

References

	

Musical groups established in 2000
Alternative rock groups from Louisiana